ICRW may refer to:

International Center for Research on Women
International Convention for the Regulation of Whaling